The murder of Francis Dixon Attygalle (known as the Attygalle murder) took place on 5 December 1906, after he was shot in the abdomen and later succumbed to his injuries in hospital. The murder became Ceylon's first sensational trial, which lay blame on Attygalle's brother-in-law John Kotelawala Sr, who committed suicide in jail before the verdict was given.

Background

John Kotelawala Sr, a police inspector married Alice Elizabeth Attygalle, daughter of the wealthy Mudaliyar Don Charles Gemoris Attygalle, after an illicit love affair to which the Attygalle family objected, but later conceded. As dowry, John Kotelawala received  of rubber and coconut estates, as well as one-fourth share of graphite mines owned by the Attygalle family. Soon after the sick Mudaliyar Gemoris Attygalle died in 1901 and Kotelawala resigned from the police force and took over the management of the Attygalle family business, since Mudaliyar's only son Francis Dixon Attygalle was a minor. Later the Mudaliyar's widow accused Kotelawala of misappropriating funds and took legal action to bar him from the family business. She filed several cases in the Kurunegala District Court to eject him from the management and Francis Dixon Attygalle left Wesley College, aged 16 to take over the family business. Petronella Attygalle made representations to the Governor and had letters of venia aetatis conferred, thus freeing Francis Dixon Attygalle from the status as a minor. She also had her second daughter Lena marry T. G. Jayewardene, an engineer in the Public Works Department and a Lieutenant in the Ceylon Light Infantry. The Jayewardenes were a family of lawyers, and Kotelawala insulted them on the day of the wedding. Thereafter, Kotelawala was removed from the management of the Attygalle family business and he ventured into his own business ventures, in transportation using bullock carts. He had confrontations in managing his estate he received as dowry from the Attygalle family which lead to increasing the animosity against the Francis Dixon Attygalle. In 1905, he formed the Ceylon-Japan Trading Company and set out to Japan on business.

Murder
Francis Dixon Attygalle, on 5 December 1906 was staying at the house of C.P. Dias, Wesley College Head Master in Pettah as was his practice when he came to Colombo from his home in Collamune Walauwa in the Salpita Korale. At 10 PM, he was called out to the veranda by a man named Baron Singho when he was shot in the abdomen and was taken to hospital in a very critical condition. The police were alerted of the incident and Herbert Dowbiggin, Superintendent of Police, Colombo went to the Pettah Police Station and then to the crime scene to direct investigations. Initial investigations indicated that a gunshot was fired from behind a bush from a crouching position. Baron Singho and Singhoney Perera, a former police constable were arrested, following a confession by a man named Piloris who had turned himself in to the police. Baron Singho and Singhoney Perera were taken to Attygalle in hospital for identification. Attygalle identified Baron Singho as the person talking to him at the time of the shooting and died soon after. With evidence indicating that Singhoney Perera was the shooter, suspicion soon fell on John Kotelawala. Singhoney Perera had served under John Kotelawala when the latter was a police inspector at the Kollupitiya Police Station in 1895. Since leaving the police, Perera lived in a house belonging to Kotelawala in Messenger Street and helped Kotelawla in collecting rents.

Arrest of Kotelawala
At the time of the murder, Kotelawala was in Japan. However, the telegrams from Kotelawala and Perera appeared suspicious. On 24 January 1907, Kotelawala returned to Colombo on board Hitachi Maru, when he was arrested by Assistant Superintendent of Police, J. H. Daniel and taken to the Fort Police Station and from there to the bungalow of the City Police Magistrate, J. F. R. Pereira. Advocates G. S. Schneider and Donald Obeyesekere, retained on Kotelawala's behalf moved for bail, but bail was refused and he was remanded till 30 January. The arrest caused a sensation in Colombo as Kotelawala was a popular figure and he was cheered by crowds gathered at Hulftsdorp.

Trial
Non-summary proceedings were held by Magistrate Keith Macleod, and these were held within the Welikada Prison as it was deemed safer and crowds that participated in the proceedings limited. After the non-summary proceedings were terminated and the case was committed to the Supreme Court of Ceylon and Kotelawala asked for an English-speaking Jury. The Supreme Court trial on 15 April at Hulftsdorf with Justice Alexander Wood Renton preceding and drew large crowds. The prosecution was led by Crown Counsel C. M. Fernando, assisted by B. W. Bawa, H. J. C. Pereira, R. H. Morgan. The accused were defended by Eardley Norton, a Calcutta Lawyer assisted by T. Thornhill, F. W. Williams, P. G. Cooke, Hayley, Schneider and Donald Obeyasekara. 

Crown Counsel, Fernando opened the case, making out that the murder was well planned. Witnesses were examined from Monday to Saturday and on 20 April the witness Pila gave evidence which was very damaging to the accused. Piloris alias Pila, was hired by Singhoney Perera and Baron Singho to carry out the murder since he knew how to handle a gun, having fought in the Boer War under Winston Churchill. Singhoney Perera and Baron Singho had also purchased a gun from the Walkers for Rs 25 and kept Pila in a rented room. They had planned to kill him after the murder but failed when Pila took a different escape route. He was arrested by the police and confessed to the murder. He was offered a pardon, in exchange for becoming a crown witness.   

On the night of 20 April, Kotelawala the first accused was admitted to the hospital with signs of poisoning and died shortly. Dr Huybertsz held the postmortem and concluded that death was due to poisoning either by arsenic or calomel. Kotelawala had left a letter to his wife stating that he had not instigated anyone to kill Francis Attygalle and that after Pila's evidence, he had no hope whatsoever. The news of the death caused much excitement in Colombo and continued till the day of the funeral. Crown Counsel Fernando's home was attacked.  

The trial found Singhoney Perera guilty and sentenced him to death. Baron Singho was acquitted. On 14 June at 8:00 AM, Perera was executed at Welikade prison.

Long term effects
Alice Elizabeth Kotelawala and her young family faced destitution having spent a large amount of funds on her husband's legal defence. On his deathbed, Francis Dixon Attygalle willed his wealth to his sister Lena Jayewardene and unmarried younger sister Ellen who married F. R. Senanayake. The Senanayakes assisted Alice Kotelawala in her situation by giving her shares of the Kahatagaha Graphite Mine and of the family estates as well as taking care of the education of the Kotelawala children. F. R. Senanayake who was leading the Sri Lankan independence movement, died on a pilgrimage to India in 1924. Senanayake's brother D. S. Senanayake took over leadership of the independence movement and formed the United National Party and was elected as the first Prime Minister of Ceylon in 1947. He was loyally supported by Kotelawala's son Sir John Kotelawala, who went on the become the third Prime Minister of Ceylon in 1953. F. R. Senanayake's son R. G. Senanayake and T. G. Jayewardene's son T. F. Jayewardene had active political careers serving as members of parliament and ministers.

References 

1906 in Ceylon
Murder in Colombo
People murdered in Sri Lanka
1906 murders in Asia
20th-century murders in Sri Lanka